Sri Venkateswara Vedic University is a state university located at Tirupati, Chittoor district, Andhra Pradesh, India. It was established in 2006 by the Government of Andhra Pradesh, sponsored by the Tirumala Tirupati Devasthanams (TTD), and focuses on Vedic studies.

History
Sri Venkateswara Vedic University establishment follows a decision taken by the Tirumala Tirupati Devasthanams (TTD) board in 1992 to establish a Vedic university at Tirupati. Following Rameshwar Thakur assuming charge as Governor of Andhra Pradesh in January 2006, he started a process which culminated in an Act for the establishment of the university, passed in September 2006.

Faculties
The institute has seven faculties:
 Faculty of Veda Adhyayana
 Faculty of Agama Adhyayana
 Faculty of Paurohitya Adhyayana
 Faculty of Vedabhashya
 Faculty of Vedaangas
 Faculty of Research & Publication
 Faculty of Modern Subjects

References

External links

Universities in Andhra Pradesh
Educational institutions established in 2006
2006 establishments in Andhra Pradesh
Universities and colleges in Tirupati
Sanskrit universities in India